Koroška is a Slovene name meaning 'Carinthia' that may refer to:

 Carinthia (state), the southernmost Austrian state
 Slovenian Carinthia, a traditional region of Slovenia
 Duchy of Carinthia,  a duchy that existed from 976 until 1918 in the territory of today's Slovenia and Austria
 Carinthia Statistical Region, a statistical region of Slovenia